Newmarket Stadium is a proposed community stadium in Wakefield, and which will be leased to Wakefield Trinity in Stanley, Wakefield, West Yorkshire, England. It will replace Belle Vue which has been home to the rugby league club for over 100 years.

Wakefield Trinity were hoping to move into the stadium for the start of the 2015 season but work has not started on the project due to the conditions for development, implemented by the Secretary of State following a public inquiry, not being met. The conditions required that 60,000 square metres of warehousing had to built out and occupied, while the Trust responsible for the management of the stadium also had to provide funding towards the build cost

The development has since stalled further which has led to Wakefield Trinity working with Wakefield Council to find a resolution, including the redevelopment of their current home at Belle Vue.

See also

List of rugby league stadiums by capacity

References

External links
Wakefield & District Community Trust

Rugby league stadiums in England
Sports venues in West Yorkshire
Buildings and structures in Wakefield
Wakefield Trinity
Proposed stadiums in the United Kingdom
Proposed buildings and structures in England